"Ariel's song" is a verse passage in Scene ii of Act I of William Shakespeare's The Tempest. It consists of two stanzas to be delivered by the spirit Ariel, in the hearing of Ferdinand. In performance it is sometimes sung and sometimes spoken. There is an extant musical setting of the second stanza by Shakespeare's contemporary Robert Johnson, which may have been used in the original production around 1611

It is the origin of the phrase full fathom five, after which there are many cultural references, and is an early written record of the phrase sea change.

Through its use of rhyme, rhythm, assonance, and alliteration, the poem sounds like a spell.

"Full fathom five"  
"Full fathom five" is the beginning of the second stanza of "Ariel's song", better known than the first stanza, and often presented alone. It implicitly addresses Ferdinand who, with his father, has just gone through a shipwreck in which the father supposedly drowned.

Selected cultural references 
 Parts or all of it have been set to music by Igor Stravinsky (Three Songs from William Shakespeare), Arthur Sullivan (The Tempest), Ralph Vaughan Williams (Three Shakespeare Songs), Pete Seeger (Two from Shakespeare), and Marianne Faithfull.
 On the gravestone of Percy Bysshe Shelley in the Protestant Cemetery in Rome the lines “Nothing of him that doth fade, / But doth suffer a sea-change / Into something rich and strange.” are engraved. His schooner, on which he sailed the day he drowned, was called ‘Ariel’.
 Rich and Strange, a 1931 film by Alfred Hitchcock

See also 
 List of titles of works based on Shakespearean phrases

References 

The Tempest